Jon Elliott Henderson (December 17, 1944 – August 2, 2020) is a former American football wide receiver in the National Football League for the Pittsburgh Steelers and the Washington Redskins.  He also played one season in the Canadian Football League for the Calgary Stampeders and helped them to win the Grey Cup in 1971.  Henderson played college football at Colorado State University and was drafted in the third round of the 1968 NFL Draft.

He served as the Steelers primary kick returner in 1968, returning 29 kicks for 589 yards but played sparingly on offense.  His best game as a wide receiver came on December 13, 1970, when he caught six passes for 120 yards for the Redskins, including a 56-yard touchdown against the Philadelphia Eagles.

References

1944 births
Living people
Players of Canadian football from Pittsburgh
American football wide receivers
Players of American football from Pittsburgh
Canadian football wide receivers
Colorado State Rams football players
Pittsburgh Steelers players
Washington Redskins players
Calgary Stampeders players